Between 1946 and 1948, 20 and 50 haléřů and 1 and 2 koruny coins were introduced. The lower two denominations were struck in bronze, the higher two in cupro-nickel. The designs of all but the 2 koruny were based on those of the interwar coins but the coins were smaller. In 1950, aluminium 1 korun coins were introduced, followed by aluminium 20 and 50h in 1951. 5 korun coins were minted but not introduced. A monetary reform occurred in 1953.

Czechoslovakia